In the field of electronics, the EF50 is an early all-glass wideband remote cutoff pentode designed in 1938 by Philips. It was a landmark in the development of vacuum tube technology, departing from construction ideas of the time, that was essentially unchanged from light bulb designs.  Initially used in television receivers, it quickly gained a vital role in British radar, and great efforts were made to secure a continuing supply of the device as Holland fell in World War II.

The EF50 tube is a 9-pin Loctal-socket device with short internal wires to nine short chromium-iron pins, making it suitable for Very High Frequency (VHF) use.

History
The EF50 was preceded by RCA's acorn design and several other attempts, such as the "Stahlröhre" (~steel tube) from Telefunken, to reduce inductance in the wire leads, all with some disadvantages.  Philips had been working from 1934 to 1935 on an alternative that would solve the problems of the other bases, and a design that could be produced cheaply and in large quantities. A presentation by M.J.O. Strutt from the tube development group at Philips Research at the first "Internationale Fernseh-Tagung in Zürich" (international television conference in Zürich) described their work in September 1938. A few months later, Professor J.L.H. Jonker, who had a leading role in the development of the EF50, published an internal Philips Research Technical Note, Titled: "New radio Tube Constructions". Jonker's role was confirmed decades later by Th. P. Tromp, head of radio-valve manufacturing and production: "Prof. Dr. Jonker (head of development lab of electronic valves in the mid-thirties) was the originator of the EF50. This development started as early as 1934–1935. It was, indeed, developed in view of possible television application."

Television requirements
Pye Ltd., a leading British electronics firm of the time, had pioneered television receiver design, and in the late 1930s, wanted to market receivers that would allow reception further and further from the single Alexandra Palace television transmitter.  Encouraged by their 1937 success with a novel tuned radio frequency (TRF) design, Pye wanted a higher quality valve than they could produce on their own, and so talked to Mullard, which meant the research of Philips in Holland, plus some tweaking from Baden John Edwards and Donald Jackson from Pye (for example the metal shield), leading to the EF50 pentode that was needed in the Pye 45 MHz TRF design, and created a stable television receiver that captured a good market, being able to receive transmissions at up to five times the distance than the competition.

Radar uses
Hugh Dowding had already seen the value of radar for his Air Defence system. Developments progressed at Bawdsey Manor from the mid-1930s; the early ground-based radar chains worked well but needed to be improved in accuracy, and Dowding saw the need for an airborne radar. At Bawdsey, Taffey Bowen had also needed a wideband valve for Airborne Interception (AI) radar; he had just one working set. So he contacted Tom Goldup, a senior director of Mullard, and "quite by chance in April or May of 1939" he heard of the Pye set from his old Professor at King's College, Edward Appleton. Visiting Pye, Bowen saw scores of what he sought, their 45 MHz TRF chassis using the very new EF50, which he later described as "a valve that was to play almost as important a part in the radar war as the magnetron". The early Chain home radars chose 45 MHz as their intermediate frequency so that they could take advantage of Pye's television front end with minimal modification. Pye's modified design was often referred to as the 'Pye 45 Megacycle IF strip'.

Flight from Holland
Because the EF50 had to come from Holland, yet was vital for the RDF (radar), great efforts were made to secure a continuing supply as the risk of Holland being overrun increased. Mullard in England did not have the ability to manufacture the special glass base, for example, and just before Germany invaded Holland, a truckload with 25,000 complete EF50s and many more of their special bases were successfully sent to England. The entire EF50 production line was hurriedly relocated to Britain. On 13 May, the day before the Germans flattened Rotterdam in 1940, members of the Philips family escaped together with the Dutch government on the British destroyer HMS Windsor, taking with them a small wooden box containing the industrial diamonds that were to be used to make the dies needed to make the fine tungsten wires in the valves.

Characteristics

Equivalents
To meet great wartime demand, the EF50 was also made by Marconi-Osram (with the name Z90) and Cossor (their version named 63SPT) in the United Kingdom as well as Mullard (who were effectively using the Philips production line after it was moved from Holland). Versions were also made in Canada by Rogers Vacuum Tube Company and in the United States by Sylvania Electric Products.

British military (Ministry of Aircraft Production Specification) and U.S. JAN type numbers assigned to the EF50 include:
 ARP35 (Army Receiving Pentode 35)
 VR91  (Original A.M. Name)
 CV1091 (from 1943)
 ZA3058 (Army)
 ZC1051 or ZC/10E/92 (Army)
 10E/92 (Air Ministry)

The tube was also assigned the GPO (PO)VT-207 type number, VT-250, and CV1578.

Valves of similar characteristics were produced with different bases, for example, the later EF42 and 9-pin miniature (B9A) EF80.

References

See also
Mullard EF50 data sheet

Vacuum tubes
Philips products